Sovata is a town in Mureș County, Transylvania, Romania. Three villages are administered by the town: Căpeți (Kopac), Ilieși (Illyésmező), and Săcădat (Szakadát). In 2004, the village of Sărățeni broke away to form an independent commune.

Geography
The town is part of the Székely Land region of the historical Transylvania province.

It is situated between the river Corund and the valley of the Târnava Mică. The river Sovata discharges into the Târnava Mică in the town. 

Sovata can be reached from Târgu Mureș, Miercurea-Ciuc, and Odorheiu Secuiesc on the  national road and from Reghin on a connection road.

History

The first data about Sovata are from 1578. By 1583 it was already a village. For 42 years, from 1876 until 1918, the village belonged to the Maros-Torda County of the Austrian-Hungarian Empire.

Due to its salty lakes and warm water it became an increasingly popular health resort during the end of the 19th and the 20th century. It gained the status of town in 1952.

Demographics 
According to the 2011 census, the town had a population of 10,385 of which 87.7% were Hungarians, 8.2% Romanians, and 1.9% Roma.

Demographic movement according to census data:

Spa
The geological events in 1875 gave birth to the Bear Lake, which is unique in Europe, its water being helio-thermal and salty, with purported therapeutic effects for chronic gynecological symptoms, severe rheumatic pains, peripheral nervous system, and post-accidental motor diseases.

There are four more salty lakes: Nut Lake, Black Lake, Red Lake, and Green Lake. In the interwar period, Sovata became one of the most fashionable spas in the country, visited several times even by the Romanian Royal Family.

See also 
 List of Hungarian exonyms (Mureș County)

References

External links

 Resort Sovata
 Sovata  
 Sovata accommodation and guide map 

Towns in Romania
Populated places in Mureș County
Spa towns in Romania
Localities in Transylvania